The 2011 NCAA Division I Men's Basketball Championship Game was the title game of the 2011 NCAA Division I men's basketball tournament and it determined the national champion for the 2010-11 NCAA Division I men's basketball season. The 2011 National Title Game was played on April 4, 2011 at Reliant Stadium in Houston, Texas, and featured the 2011 West Regional Champions, #3-seeded Connecticut, and the 2011 Southeast Regional Champions, #8 seeded Butler.

For the 1st time since the 1989 National Championship Game, neither a #1 nor a #2 seed participated in the National Championship Game.

Participants

Butler

The Butler Bulldogs had made it back to the National Championship for the second year in a row after losing their best player and eventual NBA star Gordon Hayward of the Charlotte Hornets. They were able to come back into the post season trying to play the team that they were the previous year. They were seeded as the #8 spot when in fact they had played and won some critical games. The Butler basketball team pulled off multiple upsets. Matt Howard made the game winning free throw against The University of Pittsburgh. Their first game they won by two points, then the close call with Pittsburgh, followed up by a game which led to overtime against Florida in which Butler was able to come out victorious.

Connecticut

Connecticut was a perennial powerhouse but after having a mediocre season, according to Greg Anthony, and finishing 9th in the Big East play, they were not expected to do much in the tournament. Aside from their poor regular season play, Connecticut was able to walk through their first three games without much struggle and was able to get wins over teams that were expected to do well in the tournament. Behind the phenomenal play of Kemba Walker, who is now a star for the New York Knicks in the NBA and who was able to put up a solid stat line, the team continued to advance. After those three games, they started playing teams that had potential to win the championship.

Starting lineups

 (number corresponds to draft round)

† = 2011 All-American

Game summary

Summary 
For the first time since 1989 there was not a #1 or #2 seed team in the championship game. Butler is only the second #8 seed to make it the championship game when Villanova took down top seeded Georgetown 66-64. The 2011 National Championship game was between Butler, a mid-major university team that was a surprise finalist in the 2010 tournament, and The University of Connecticut, a basketball powerhouse which had previously won the tournament twice under coach Jim Calhoun but had an average regular season finishing 9th in the Big East Conference before winning The Big East Tournament with five wins in five consecutive days (never before accomplished in NCAA history). The championship game was won by Connecticut 53–41. It was a very defensive contest, with Butler having the fewest points in a championship game since 1949. Butler led at halftime 22–19, but suffered in the second half from poor shooting, making only 6 out of 37 shots in the second half. Butler's 18.8 percent shooting for the entire game was the lowest ever in the NCAA final. Connecticut contributed to Butler's poor shooting by blocking 10 shots, also a championship game record. Butler was led in scoring by junior guard Shelvin Mack with 13 points, while UConn freshman Jeremy Lamb scored 12 points in the 2nd half. The win by Connecticut completed a season-ending 11-game win streak that began with the Big East Tournament. The game was widely viewed as a poor quality final.    In reference to the game's first half of play, CBS analyst Greg Anthony said, "This is the worst half of basketball I've ever seen in a national championship game.”

First half

Along with the poor offensive performance form both teams, Butler managed to shoot an extremely low 18% from the floor. Shelvin Mack of Butler made a three pointer with less than 10 seconds left to make it 22-19 heading into halftime. This was one of the worst offensive games and shooting performances by any team in college all year long. According to Greg Anthony, long time sports broadcaster and basketball player himself, said “This is the worst half of basketball I've ever seen in a national championship game”

Second half

The second half was no better for Butler going 6 for 37 to end the game. On the other hand, University of Connecticut came out a little hot. They started how they left off, with a huge three. After that shot fell the rest of the players on Connecticut started to heat up, including star, Kemba Walker. Although they didn't go on any huge runs to extend the lead tremendously, they were able to push it up to 14 when they had the score 30-44 with about three to four minutes left in the second half. Butler was able to get within nine making 49-40 but at that point with 1:31 left on the clock it was out of reach with the way their shooting was going for them. Connecticut's last 8 points were all free throws concluding the game and sealing the deal for the win with a final score of 53-41.

References

NCAA Division I Men's Basketball Championship Game
NCAA Division I Men's Basketball Championship Games
Butler Bulldogs men's basketball
UConn Huskies men's basketball
College basketball tournaments in Texas
Basketball competitions in Houston
April 2011 sports events in the United States
NCAA Division I Men's Basketball Championship Game
2011 in Houston